Hai (Finnish, lit. Shark) or Requin (French, lit. Shark) is a one-design, sloop-rigged keelboat designed in Finland. It was designed in 1930 by Finnish sailboat designer Gunnar Stenbäck as a cheap racing and cruising yacht suitable for mass production. It remains a popular small yacht in Finland and France.

History

In the 1920s, one-design yacht classes were relatively scarce and dominating form of yacht racing were various construction classes, which' boats were designed and built one at the time, and thus were quite expensive. Many Nordic top sailors and designers expressed concern about the future of the sport, and Stenbäck argued strongly that only in one-design class the costs could be kept suitably low. As a result, Hai design specified inexpensive materials (Northern pine and oak, iron ballast instead of lead) and relatively small sail area so that winches were not required. Keel was long and shallow, to ensure safety on rocky Baltic waters.

Stenbäck presented his design in 1930; the first boat was built and presented to the public next year and the design soon proved popular and many yards began constructing the class. The HSS yachtclub in Helsinki was instrumental in giving impetus to the class before World War II. Boats were also exported; around 100 boats to France, some thirty to USA and also to Germany, Sweden and Baltic countries. However, class rules requirement of Finnish made sails slowed down growth abroad and although this was later relaxed, no international class association was ever set up. After World War II, Hai faced stiff competition from Nordic Folkboat and Dragon (which was accepted as Olympic class) and it never achieved same international status. However, it was the biggest keelboat class in Finland until the 1960s, when it was supplanted by Hans Groop's H-boat, also a class initiated by HSS. Despite this, it remains an active competition class and construction of new boats has continued to the day, although in dwindling numbers. In total, around 290 boats have been registered in Finland. The Finnish Hai is somewhat unusual in that it has remained very similar to its original form, with wooden hulls and spars - GRP boats are not allowed.

French Requin

In France the boat (known as Requin) gained large following and to date, nearly 500 boats have been registered. Owing to lack of authoritative international class association, Requin evolved independently from Finnish class. Plastic is nowadays allowed as hull material, as is aluminium for spars. Genoa is also allowed in Requin.

Hai 2000

A modernized Finnish GRP variant of Hai; hull based on Requin, aluminium spar. Mainsail , jib , spinnaker . Some wooden Hai boats have also been rigged for Hai 2000 class.

International competition

Though as noted, Hai has never been a major international competition class, some regattas between boats from different countries have been organized, especially in the 1930s when boat was gaining popularity around Baltic, but also in recent years, featuring boats from Finland, Germany and France.

See also
Särklass A
Särklass C

References

External links
 Requin class association
 History of Hai (in English)
 Jakobstads Båtvarv, builder of wooden Hai-boats

Keelboats
Vehicles introduced in 1930
1930s sailboat type designs
Sailboat type designs by Finnish designers
Sailboat types built in Finland